Charles Robin Britt (born June 29, 1942) is a former Member of the United States House of Representatives from North Carolina's 6th congressional district.  A Democrat, he served one term from 1983 to 1985.

Britt grew up in Asheville, North Carolina and graduated from Enka High School in 1959. He received a B.A. from the University of North Carolina at Chapel Hill in 1963 and a Juris Doctor from the same institution as well as an LL.M. degree from New York University in 1976. He was admitted to the North Carolina bar in 1973 and commenced practice in Greensboro.  From 1963 until 1984, he was a member of the United States Naval Reserve.

Britt was a delegate to the North Carolina State Democratic convention in 1980.  In 1982, he was elected to Congress  from a Greensboro-based district, defeating one-term Republican Eugene Johnston.  He was narrowly defeated  for reelection in 1984 by State Representative Howard Coble, largely due to Ronald Reagan's victory that year; Reagan carried the district by a nearly 2-to-1 margin.

Britt sought a rematch against Coble in 1986, and lost by only 79 votes—by far the closest margin in any congressional election that year.

Britt served as president and director of Project Uplift in Greensboro, N.C. and as secretary of the North Carolina State Department of Human Resources 1993 to 1997.

Britt attempted a comeback in 2002 in the newly drawn 13th district, which contained parts of Greensboro.  However, Britt was defeated in the Democratic primary by Brad Miller of Raleigh.

References

External links
 

1942 births
Living people
State cabinet secretaries of North Carolina
Politicians from San Antonio
New York University School of Law alumni
Democratic Party members of the United States House of Representatives from North Carolina
Politicians from Asheville, North Carolina
Candidates in the 1986 United States elections
20th-century American politicians
Candidates in the 2002 United States elections
21st-century American politicians